Women of the Theatre (Spanish:Mujeres de teatro) is a 1951 Mexican musical film directed by René Cardona and starring Emilia Guiú, Rosita Fornés and María Victoria.

The film's art direction was by Francisco Marco Chillet.

Cast

References

Bibliography 
  Rogelio Agrasánchez. Beauties of Mexican Cinema. Agrasanchez Film Archive, 2001.

External links 
 

1951 films
1951 musical films
Mexican musical films
1950s Spanish-language films
Films directed by René Cardona
Mexican black-and-white films
1950s Mexican films